Anolis cobanensis, or Stuart's anole, is a species of lizard in the family Dactyloidae. The species is found in Guatemala and Mexico.

References

Anoles
Reptiles of Guatemala
Reptiles of Mexico
Reptiles described in 1942
Taxa named by Laurence Cooper Stuart